Meghan Jeanne Lenczyk (born March 15, 1989) is an American professional soccer player who last played for Sky Blue FC of the National Women's Soccer League (NWSL). She also played for Atlanta Beat and Philadelphia Independence.

References

External links

1989 births
Living people
American women's soccer players
NJ/NY Gotham FC players
Atlanta Beat (WPS) players
Philadelphia Independence players
Women's Professional Soccer players
Virginia Cavaliers women's soccer players
Women's association football forwards